This list of current cities, towns, unincorporated communities, counties, and other recognized places in the U.S. state of South Dakota also includes information on the number and names of counties in which the place lies, and its lower and upper zip code bounds, if applicable.

See also
List of cities in South Dakota
List of counties in South Dakota

References
USGS Fips55 database

A